was a Japanese industrialist and shipbuilder. He was the founder of Kawasaki Heavy Industries.

Biography 
Born in Kagoshima to a kimono merchant, Kawasaki Shōzō became a tradesman at the age of 17 in Nagasaki, the only place in Japan then open to the West. He started a shipping business in Osaka at 27, which failed when his cargo ship sank during a storm. In 1869, he joined a company handling sugar from the Ryukyu Islands, established by a Kagoshima samurai, and in 1893, researched Ryukyu sugar and sea routes to the Ryukyus at the request of the Ministry of Finance. In 1894, he was appointed executive vice president of Japan Mail Steam-Powered Shipping Company,  and succeeded in opening a sea route to the Ryukyu and transporting sugar to mainland Japan.

Having experienced many sea accidents in his life, Kawasaki deepened his trust in Western ships because they were more spacious, stable and faster than typical Japanese ships. At the same time, he became very interested in the modern shipbuilding industry. In April 1876, supported by Matsukata Masayoshi, the Vice Minister of Finance, who was from the same province as Kawasaki, he established Kawasaki Tsukiji Shipyard on borrowed land from the government alongside the Sumida-gawa River, Tsukiji Minami-Iizaka-chō (currently Tsukiji 7-chome, Chūō, Tokyo, a major step forward as a shipbuilder.

Kawasaki Heavy Industries, Ltd. traces its origins to 1878, when Kawasaki Shōzō (川崎 正蔵) established Kawasaki Tsukiji Shipyard in Tokyo, Japan. Eighteen years later, in 1896, it was incorporated as Kawasaki Dockyard Co., Ltd.

References 

1837 births
1912 deaths
Japanese shipbuilders
Members of the House of Peers (Japan)
Kazoku
Japanese art collectors
Kawasaki Heavy Industries
People from Kagoshima
Japanese businesspeople